Santosh Ram  is an Indian writer, director and producer. He is widely known for his short films Vartul (2009), Galli (2015) and Prashna (2020), which have been awarded and screened at various film festivals around the world. His debut short film Vartul   which was screened at over 56 film festivals, winning thirteen awards.
Prashna (Question) 2020 was shortlisted for Filmfare Short Film Awards 2020. Santosh Ram Won The Iris Award for Special Mention( Writing ) for Prashna at UNICEF Innocenti Film Festival 2021 in Florence, Italy.

Early life and background
Ram was born in Dongershelki, District Latur, Maharashtra. Ram grew up in a middle-class family in Udgir, Maharashtra, India. Ram was influenced by the childhood he spent in the Marathwada region.

Career
Santosh began his filmmaking career by writing and directing shorts  in 2009. His debut Marathi language short film Vartul he shot on 35mm film.Vartul (2009) screened at over 56 national and international film festivals including 11th Osian's Cinefan Film Festival  2009, New Delhi, 3rd International Documentary and Short Film Festival Of Kerala, 2010, India, Third Eye 8th Asian Film Festival  2009, Mumbai, and 17th Toronto Reel Asian International Film Festival 2013 (Canada), winning thirteen awards. His second short film Galli (2015) screened in 13 National and International film festivals. His latest film Prashna ( 2020)  is shortlisted for Filmfare Short Film Awards 2020  and officially selected for 36 film festivals  all over the world, winning seventeen awards.

Filmography
{| class="wikitable sortable"
|-
!Year
!Film
!Language
!Director
!Writer
!Producer
!class="unsortable" | Notes
|-
| 2009 || Vartul ||  Marathi language|Marathi ||  ||  ||  ||Official Selection in Fifty three Film FestivalsWinning 14 Awards 
|-
| 2015 || Galli || Marathi language|Marathi ||  ||  || || Official Selection in Thirteen Film Festivals Short Film
|-
| 2020 ||  Prashna ||Marathi ||  ||  ||||Official Selection in Thirty Four Film Festivals Winning Sixteen Awards 
|-
| 2023 || The Story of Yuvraj and Shahajahan||Marathi, Hindi||  ||  ||||Short Film
|-
| 2024 || China Mobile   ||Marathi||  ||  |||| Feature Film 
|}

Awards and recognition Vartul 2009

 Best Film - 4th International Short Film Festival of India 2010, Chennai.
 Best Film - 2nd International Film Festival Nagpur 2011
 Best Director - Pune Short Film Festival 2011, Pune
 Best Film  - 6th Goa Marathi Film Festival 2013, Goa
 Best Children Film - Malabar Short Film Festival 2013
 Appreciation Award for Excellence in Film making- Kanyakumari International Film Festival 2013, Kanyakumari
 Jury Special Mention  -Navi Mumbai International Film Festival  2014, Navi Mumbai
 Best Film - Barshi Short Film Festival 2014
 Best Film - 1st Maharashtra Short Film Festival 2014
 Nominated - Mahrashtra Times Awards 2010Prashna'' 2020
  The Iris Award Special Mention(Writing) at  UNICEF Innocenti Film Festival 2021 Florence, Italy .
 Nomination - Best Short Film - Filmfare Awards 2020
 Best Short Film - 3rd Vintage International Film Festival, 2020
 Best Short Film - 4th Anna Bhau Sathe International Film Festival,2021 
 Best Social Short Film - Bettiah International Film Festival,2020
 Best Short Film Special Honourable Mention - Sprouting Seed International Short Film Festival,2020
 Best Director - 4th Anna Bhau Sathe International Film Festival,2021 
 Best Screenplay - 4th Anna Bhau Sathe International Film Festival,2021 
 Best Short Fiction Film Special Mention - 14th SiGNS Short and Documentary Film Festival, 2021
 Best Short Film - 6th Bengal International Short Film Festival, 2021
 Special Jury Mention Award - 9th Smita Patil Documentary and Short Film Festival, Pune.
 Best Story - Ma Ta Short Film Festival 2022. , Mumbai
 Diploma of the international competition of short feature films "For the development of education in remote areas".

References

External links
 

Living people
Indian filmmakers
21st-century Indian film directors
Film directors from Mumbai
1979 births